Jagdish Chander is an Indian politician who is serving as Member of 15th Rajasthan Assembly from Sadulshahar Assembly constituency. In 2018 Rajasthan Legislative Assembly election he got 73,153 votes.

References 

Rajasthan MLAs 2018–2023
Living people
Year of birth missing (living people)
Indian politicians